Jean-Marie Léonard (14 July 1943 – 9 August 2021) was a Belgian politician. A member of the Socialist Party (PS), he served in the Chamber of Representatives of Belgium from 1990 to 1995 and the Parliament of Wallonia from 1990 to 2004.

He was President of the Union Socialiste Communale de Flémalle and served in the cabinets of Minister-Presidents Jean-Maurice Dehousse and Yvan Ylieff.

His son, served in the Parliament of Wallonia and the Parliament of the French Community.

References

1943 births
2021 deaths
20th-century Belgian politicians
21st-century Belgian politicians
Belgian Socialist Party politicians
Members of the Parliament of Wallonia
Members of the Chamber of Representatives (Belgium)
People from Flémalle